HD 179821 or V1427 Aquilae is either a post-red supergiant yellow hypergiant or a post-AGB yellow supergiant star in the constellation of Aquila, surrounded by a detached dust shell.  It is a semi-regular variable nearing the end of its life.

Discovery
HD 179821 was first catalogued as an unremarkable 8th magnitude star at the start of the 20th century.  It was later listed as a spectral standard G4 0-Ia, indicating a highly luminous star type now known as a hypergiant.

It was first considered notable for its infrared excess and double-peaked spectral energy distribution in the infrared.  These were considered to be indicators of surrounding dust and HD 179821 was identified as a possible proto-planetary nebula.  Variability was also detected.

High resolution spectroscopic studies and modern space-based observations have revealed an unusual chemical makeup and a hollow spherical dust shell, but haven't fully resolved whether HD 179821 is a highly luminous yellow hypergiant or a more modest dying star.

Observations
HD 179821 has a cold detached dust shell that has been studied with the help of the Hubble Space Telescope.  The shell is approximately circular in shape, has an inner diameter of ~3".3 corresponding to 20,000 AU at 6,000 pc, and an outer diameter of 5".7 or more, with the star 0".35 from the centre of the shell.  The current mass loss is low, but during the formation of the shell it is estimated to have been , an exceptionally high rate being comparable to that of the archetypical OH/IR red supergiant, VY Canis Majoris.  Like its constellation neighbor and also hypergiant star IRC +10420, it is surrounded by an extended reflection nebula. Discovered at near-IR wavelength, this indicates a massive star and, as with the reflection nebula around IRC +10420, it may be masking a star hotter than the given G5 spectral type.

It is that which contributes to a double-peaked spectral energy distribution. It is estimated the star has lost about 10% of its initial mass after being a red supergiant star just 1,600 years ago, and is a likely supernova candidate.

The distance was once estimated to be around 6,000 parsecs. According to the studies of Jura et al (2001), the star may explode as a supernova in the next 100,000 years.

Variability

HD 179821 is a semiregular variable star with the variable star designation V1427 Aquilae.  Between 1899 and 1989, its photographic apparent magnitude varied erratically between about magnitudes 9 and 10, although coverage is not complete and some larger variations may have been missed.  It then varied by no more than 0.1 magnitudes until 2009, at a visual magnitude around 8.1.

The colour of the star changed noticeably so that the variability at different wavelengths is not consistent. In general, the star became bluer from 1899 until 1990, and then redder again. Pulsations for much of this time occurred with an approximate period of 100 to 150 days, although this increased to 250 days between 2010 and 2017, which is expected for stars which are decreasing in temperature. At its coolest, the spectral type has been recorded as K4, while near its hottest in 2007 it was classified as F7.

Chemical composition
The chemical composition of this star differs from that of other yellow supergiant stars. The star is moderately metal-deficient and the main elements present in the star (apart from hydrogen and helium) are oxygen, carbon and nitrogen. Molecules such as hydrogen isocyanide, sulfur monoxide and HCO+ have been detected in the circumstellar envelope of the star. These molecules may result from an active photochemistry, generated by UV photons emitted by the central star as it warms up, or can be produced in shocks.

Controversy
While most authors consider HD 179821 to be a warm hypergiant star, others think it is actually a protoplanetary nebula or a smaller post-AGB star at a distance of 1 kiloparsec (3,200 light years).

This discrepancy arises because its distance was too great to be measured by parallax before the Gaia mission and it has some properties of both a yellow hypergiant and a protoplanetary nebula/Post-AGB star.

See also
 List of supernova candidates

Notes

References

Sources

Aquila (constellation)
179821
G-type hypergiants
G-type supergiants
K-type supergiants
Post-asymptotic-giant-branch stars
Protoplanetary nebulae
Aquilae, V1427
094496
BD-00 3679
Semiregular variable stars
J19135861+0007319